Chunda (Urdu:وانڈہ چنڈہ) is a village of district Dera Ismail Khan, province Khyber Pakhtunkhwa, Pakistan.

Location
Wanda Chunda is located east side of the Dera Ismail Khan-Bannu Road.
It is about four kilometer 4 km away from Pakistan famous Cement Factory, Lucky Cement Factory(Darra Pezu) .
it is situated on the Peshawar-Karachi highway road.

Nearby areas
There are small villages lying around Chunda (i.e. Wanda Kali, Obbo Wanda, Garra Imam Shah & Wanda Jandar.
Famous tourists place Sheikh Badin has a small distance with Chunda. 
Wanda Chuda is 8 km eight kilometer away from its union council Giloti and having the same distance from Darra Pezu.

References
Wanda Chunda on Urdu wiki 
وانڈہ چنڈہ

See also
Wanda Jandar

Dera Ismail Khan District